The Irish League in season 1937–38 comprised 14 teams, and Belfast Celtic won the championship after a play-off with Derry City.

League standings

Results

References
Northern Ireland - List of final tables (RSSSF)

NIFL Premiership seasons
North
Football
Football
1937–38 in Northern Ireland association football